Cyaniriodes libna is a species of butterfly of the family Lycaenidae. It is found in South-East Asia.

Subspecies
C. l. libna (Borneo)
C. l. andersonii (Moore, 1884) (southern Burma, Mergui, Thailand, Peninsular Malaya, Langkawi)
C. l. klossi Riley [1945] (Indonesia: Mentawi Island)
C. l. miotsukushi Hayashi, 1976 (Philippines: Palawan)
C. l. samarana Schröder & Treadaway, 1994 (Philippines: Samar)
C. l. tawicolana Schröder & Treadaway, 1994 (Philippines: Tawitawi)

Gallery

References

Butterflies described in 1869
Poritiinae
Butterflies of Borneo
Taxa named by William Chapman Hewitson
Butterflies of Asia